Ben Ross (born 1980) is an Australian rugby league footballer.

Ben Ross may also refer to:

 C. Ben Ross (1876–1946), Governor of Idaho
 Ben Ross (Australian rules footballer) (born 1988)
 Ben Ross (freed lumberman) (died 1871), father of Harriet Tubman
 Ben Barron Ross (1921–2016), American politician
 Benjamin Ross, British writer and film director

See also
 Ben Ross Schneider, American political scientist
 William Benjamin Ross (1855–1929), Canadian politician, lawyer and businessman
 Benjamin Ross Hayden (born 1989), Canadian  actor and film director
 Ross Benjamin, American translator